The  General Aviation Awards Program  is an American program organized by Federal Aviation Administration (FAA) and a large number of general aviation industry sponsors. The awards, presented annually for more than 50 years, recognize individual general aviation professionals on the local, regional, and national levels for their contributions to aviation, education, and flight safety.

The General Aviation Awards Program is administered by volunteer members of  General Aviation Awards, Inc., a nonprofit organization. Awards are presented to professionals in the following fields:
 Certificated Flight Instructor
 Aviation Maintenance Technician (AMT)
 FAASTeam Representative

Candidates are selected based on long-term performance, specific accomplishments and contributions in their specific fields.

District award winners are chosen by industry peers at the more than 80 FAA  Flight Standards District Offices (FSDOs) located throughout the United States. Regional award winners are then chosen from among these and announced by representatives of the nine FAA Regional Offices.  In July of each year, the three national award recipients are honored in a ceremony at EAA AirVenture in Oshkosh, Wisconsin; traditionally, the awards are presented by the  FAA Administrator.

See also

 List of aviation awards

References

External links 
 General Aviation Awards website
 FAA-sponsored award programs
 2019 award winners
 how to donate/sponsor
 2019 Sponsors
 2020 Award Winners
 Honorees Live Broadcasts at FAASafety.gov

Federal Aviation Administration
Aviation awards
Awards established in 1963